France Bevk (17 September 1890 – 17 September 1970) was a Slovene writer, poet and translator. He also wrote under the pseudonym Pavle Sedmak.

Biography

Bevk was born in the mountain village of Zakojca (Coizza during Italian rule, now part of the Municipality of Cerkno) in the County of Gorizia and Gradisca of what was then the Austro-Hungarian Empire, now in Slovenia. He was the oldest of eight children born to the tenant farmer and shoemaker Ivan Bevk and his wife Katarina (née Čufer).

Bevk attended school in Bukovo until 1904, and then in Kranj (1905), Koper (1908), and Gorizia (1909), and became a teacher in the Slovene Littoral. His first teaching position was in the village of Orehek. During the First World War he was a soldier on the Eastern Front and for a while at a military school in Hungary.

After the war he worked for various newspapers in Ljubljana. In 1920 he moved to Gorizia dedicating himself to cultural and political activism in the Slovene Littoral, then under Italian rule. He was frequently prosecuted by Italian Fascist authorities and interned for his activities. In 1935 he had to leave the Julian March and moved to Ljubljana, in the Kingdom of Yugoslavia. There, he came in contact with the vibrant cultural life of the Slovenian capital, becoming friends with figures such as the painter Zoran Mušič, writer Vladimir Bartol, political activist and author Lavo Čermelj, literary critic Josip Vidmar and art historian France Stele.

After the Axis invasion of Yugoslavia in April 1941, he was imprisoned by the Italian occupation authorities due to his public Anti-Fascist stance. In 1943, he escaped from prison and joined the Slovene Partisans. After the end of World War II, he moved to Trieste and later back to Ljubljana. In 1953 he became a member of the Slovenian Academy of Sciences and Arts. He received the Prešeren Award, the most prestigious award for artistic achievements in Slovenia, twice, in 1949 and in 1954. He died in Ljubljana on his 80th birthday.

Work 

Bevk started writing at the age of sixteen with encouragement from the influential feminist editor Zofka Kveder. In his early poems, Bevk was influenced by the vitalist poetry of Oton Župančič and Maurice Maeterlinck. After the experience of World War I, he came under the influence of Christian expressionism which represented a strong literary and artistic current in interwar Slovenia. Some of its most talented representatives, such as the poet Joža Lovrenčič and Ivan Pregelj, came from Bevk's native region of Goriška. At first, he followed their examples, but later moved to social realism. He became known in the 1930s with his novels describing the struggle of the Slovene people from the Julian March to maintain their identity against the Fascist Italianization. His best-known work was the novel Kaplan Martin Čedermac (The Vicar Martin Čedermac), in which he described the inner struggles of a Roman Catholic priest in the westernmost Slovene ethnic region known as Venetian Slovenia. The novel was published under a pseudonym by the publishing house Slovenska matica in 1938 and soon became a best-seller. The term Čedermac is still used in Slovene to refer to the Roman Catholic clergy in the Slovene Littoral that struggled to defend the Slovene identity of their flock under the Italian Fascist regime. His realist literature pay attention to topics of land ownership, arranged marriage, alcoholism and conservativism in rural settings.

Later in his life, Bevk devoted himself largely to children's literature. He was a very prolific author: when a complete bibliography was made on the occasion of his 70th birthday, it was determined that Bevk had written over 100 books.

Legacy 
Although Bevk is still revered as the author of the popular novel The Vicar Martin Čedermac, he is mostly remembered as an author of children's literature. The regional library in Nova Gorica is named after him, as well as the central square in the town.

Essential Bibliography

Poetry 
 Pesmi (Poems) (1921)
 Smeh skozi solze (Laughter Through Tears) (1959)

Adult works 

 Faraon (Pharaoh) (1922)
 Rablji (Executioners) (1923)
 Suženj demona (Slave of the Demon) (1925)
 Kajn (Cain) (1925) (drama)
 Smrt pred hišo (Death in Front of the House) (1925), re-published with major changes in 1934 under the title Ljudje pod Osojnikom (People under Osojnik)
 Muka gospe Vere (Mrs. Vera's Torment) (1925)
 Julijan Sever (1926)
 Beg pred senco (Fleeing Before the Shadow) (1926)
 Hiša v strugi (The House in the Riverbed) (1927)
 Jakec in njegova ljubezen (Jakec and His Love) (1927)
 Kresna noč (Bonfire Night) [of the Summer Solstice] (1927) (a historical novel)
Krvavi jezdeci (Bloody Riders), (1927), part 1 of the Znamenja na nebu (Signs in the Sky) trilogy
 Vihar (Storm) (1928)
 Krivda (Blame) (1929)
Škorpijoni zemlje (Scorpions of the Earth), (1929), part 2 of the Znamenja na nebu (Signs in the Sky) trilogy
 V zablodah (In Delusions) (1929; rewritten with new title Zablode (Delusions) in 1963)
 Mati (Mother) (1929)
Črni bratje in sestre (Black Brothers and Sisters), (1929), part 3 of the Znamenja na nebu (Signs in the Sky) trilogy
 Gospodična Irma (Miss Irma) (1930)
 Mrtvi se vračajo (The Dead Return) (1930)
 Kamnarjev Jurij (Jurij from the Kamnar Farm) (1930)
 Vedomec (Spirit) (1930)
 Človek proti človeku (Man Against Man) (1930)
 Umirajoči bog Triglav (The Dying God Triglav) (1930, 1960, 2018)
 Burkež gospoda Viterga (Sir Viterg's Jester) (1931)
 Stražni ognji (Guard Fires) (1931)
 In sonce je obstalo (And The Sun Stopped) (1931, published in book form in 1963)
 Železna kača (Iron Snake) (1932)
 Žerjavi (Cranes) (1932)
 Veliki Tomaž (Big Thomas) (1932)
 Dedič (Heir) (1933)
 Gmajna (Woods) (1933)
 Človek brez krinke (Man without a Mask) (1934; reissued with the title Brez krinke (Without a Mask) in 1960)
 Huda ura (Heavy Weather) (1934)
 Ubogi zlodej (Poor Devil) (1934)
 Samote (Lonelinesses) (1935)
 V mestu gorijo luči (The Lights are on in Town) (1936)
 Srebrniki (Silver Coins) (1936)
 Začudene oči (Surprised Eyes) (1936)
 Kaplan Martin Čedermac (The Vicar Martin Čedermac) (1938)
 Pravica do življenja (Right to Life) (1939)
 Dan se je nagibal (The Day Is Coming) (1939)
 Domačija (Homestead) (1939; published as a book in 1960)
 Mlada njiva (New Field) (1940)
 Med dvema vojnama (Between Two Wars) (1946)
 Novele (Short Stories) (1947)
 Obračun (Settlement) (1950)
 Še bo kdaj pomlad (Spring Will Come Again) (1950) (film script)
 Pot v svobodo (Road into Freedom) (1953)
 Tuja kri (Foreign Blood) (1954)
 Krivi računi (Wrong Dealings) (1956)
 Črna srajca (Blackshirt) (1956)
 Iskra pod pepelom (A Spark in the Ashes)(1956)
 Viharnik (Storm-Weathered Tree) (1957)
 Mrak za rešetkami (Darkness Behind Bars) (1958)
 Slepa ulica (Blind Alley) (1961)

Juvenile Fiction 

 Tatič (The Little Thief) (1916–1917)
 Jagoda (Strawberry) (1930)
 Lukec in njegov škorec (Little Luka and His Starling) (1931)
 Lukec išče očeta (Little Luka Looks for Father) (1932)
 Kozorog (The Ibex) (1933)
 Tovariša (Two Comrades) (1934)
 Pastirci (Shepherds) (1935)
 Pestrna (The Nanny) (1939)
 Tonček (1948)
 Mali upornik (The Little Rebel) (1951)
 Črni bratje (Black Brothers) (1952)
 Razbojnik Saladin (The Bandit Saladin) (1959)
 Učiteljica Breda (Breda the Teacher) (1963)
 Iz iskre požar (Conflagration from a Spark) (1963)

See also 
Slovenian literature
Culture of Slovenia
Liberation Front of the Slovenian People

References

1890 births
1970 deaths
People from the Municipality of Cerkno
Slovenian poets
Slovenian male poets
Slovenian translators
Italian–Slovene translators
Members of the Slovenian Academy of Sciences and Arts
Prešeren Award laureates
Yugoslav Partisans members
Presidents of the Slovene Writers' Association
Levstik Award laureates
Ethnic Slovene people
Austro-Hungarian military personnel of World War I
Yugoslav writers
20th-century male writers
20th-century translators
20th-century poets